Michael Bean is a Canadian actor, author, acting coach, and the founder of Biz Studio. He is known for his work on the films Case 39 (2009), The Imaginarium of Doctor Parnassus (2009), The Day the Earth Stood Still and Jennifer's Body (2009), and for guest spots on the television series Arrow, Pretty Little Liars, Supernatural and Smallville.

Early life
Bean has been acting since elementary school, as a fine arts school was built two blocks from his house when he was in the fourth grade. He graduated from the Langley Fine Arts School in 1995.

Career
Bean is an actor, author, acting school owner, and acting coach. He has appeared in a diverse range of roles in television and film since his acting career began in 2006. He has also appeared in a few theatrical productions, including: Proof, Shady Business, Bash Plays, Hard Times Hit Parade, and Theatre Sports. and is the author of "Confidence on Camera: A Handbook for Young Actors", which is used by many Vancouver talent agents as a primer for clients new to the film industry.

Television
Bean has made appearances in several television shows since 2006, appearing in a diverse range of minor roles that include: scientist (The Whispers, 2015), train station official (Intruders, 2014), lawyer (Motive, 2014), doctor (Falling Skies, 2014), secretary (Arrow, 2013), pastor (Supernatural, 2009), minister (Pretty Little Liars, 2010), grief counselor (Reaper, 2009), husband (Eureka, 2007), volunteer (The Guard, 2008), receptionist (Smallville, 2007), lab technician (The 4400, 2006), and monk (Three Moons Over Milford, 2006).

Film
Bean has been appearing in film since 2006. His film credits include: Festival (2006), Canes (2006), Breakup.com (2008), The Imaginarium of Doctor Parnassus (2009), Jennifer's Body (2009), Love Happens (2009), The Big Year (2011), and Dead Rising: Watchtower (2015).

Biz Studio
Bean founded Biz Studio—a professional screen acting school for children and teenagers—in 2002 in an effort to "prepare young actors to audition and work in BC's film and television industry by providing professional, practical, small-group on-camera training".

Located in Vancouver, British Columbia, Canada's Beatty St. studios, Biz Studio features additional instructors who are overseen by Bean, some of whom have included the late Julie Patzwald (1980 - 2012), Alison Araya, Laura Bertram, and Stephanie Halber. The instructors teach classes for three different age groupings and see many of their students go on to perform in film, television, and commercials.

One goal for Biz Studio is "to demand the highest level of performance from our students, while still encouraging their love of acting by balancing discipline with fun. We are passionate about good acting. And fun."

Alumni of Biz Studio have included Brett Kelly (Bad Santa, Unaccompanied Minors), Montana Hunter, Megan Charpentier (Frankie + Alice, Resident Evil: Retribution), Haley Hunt, and Sean Roche (The Guard).

Filmography

References

External links
 
 

Living people
Male actors from Vancouver
Canadian male film actors
Canadian male television actors
Year of birth missing (living people)